Mylomys is a genus of rodent in the family Muridae. 
It contains the following species:
 African groove-toothed rat (Mylomys dybowskii)
 Ethiopian mylomys (Mylomys rex)

References

 
Rodent genera
Taxa named by Oldfield Thomas
Taxonomy articles created by Polbot